Dolichoderus brevipennis is an extinct species of ant in the genus Dolichoderus. Described by Dlussky in 2008, the fossils were found in the Bitterfeld amber.

References

†
Oligocene insects
Prehistoric insects of Europe
Fossil taxa described in 2008
Fossil ant taxa